Juan Diego Angeloni (born 24 June 1978, in Rosario del Tala) is an Argentine rifle shooter. He competed in the 50 m rifle prone event at the 2012 Summer Olympics, where he placed 50th and last. He won the bronze medal at the 2007 Pan American Games.

References

1978 births
Living people
Argentine male sport shooters
Pan American Games bronze medalists for Argentina
Olympic shooters of Argentina
Shooters at the 2012 Summer Olympics
Sportspeople from Entre Ríos Province
Pan American Games medalists in shooting
Shooters at the 2015 Pan American Games
South American Games silver medalists for Argentina
South American Games bronze medalists for Argentina
South American Games medalists in shooting
Competitors at the 2014 South American Games
Medalists at the 2007 Pan American Games